The 2015–16 Bethune–Cookman Wildcats men's basketball team represented Bethune–Cookman University during the 2015–16 NCAA Division I men's basketball season. The Wildcats, led by fifth year head coach Gravelle Craig, played their home games at the Moore Gymnasium and were members of the Mid-Eastern Athletic Conference. They finished the season 14–18, 10–6 in MEAC play to finish in fourth place. They lost in the quarterfinals of the MEAC tournament to Savannah State.

Roster

Schedule

|-
!colspan=9 style="background:#6A3547; color:#E4A41D;"| Regular season

|-
!colspan=9 style="background:#6A3547; color:#E4A41D;"| MEAC tournament

References

Bethune–Cookman Wildcats men's basketball seasons
Bethune-Cookman